The Poll Winners Ride Again! is an album by guitarist Barney Kessel with drummer Shelly Manne and bassist Ray Brown, recorded in 1958 and released on the Contemporary label. The album was the second of five to be released by the group.

Reception

The Allmusic review by Scott Yanow states: "This is a good outing, particularly for bop guitarist Barney Kessel".

Track listing
 "Be Deedle Dee Do" (Barney Kessel) - 5:32
 "Volare" (Franco Migliacci, Domenico Modugno) - 4:20
 "Spring Is Here" (Richard Rodgers, Lorenz Hart) - 4:07
 "The Surrey with the Fringe on Top" (Rogers, Oscar Hammerstein II) - 5:27
 "Custard Puff" (Ray Brown) - 4:25
 "When the Red, Red Robin (Comes Bob, Bob, Bobbin' Along)" (Harry M. Woods) - 4:15
 "Foreign Intrigue" (Kessel) - 3:22
 "Angel Eyes" (Matt Dennis, Earl Brent) - 4:40
 "The Merry-Go-Round Broke Down" (Dave Franklin, Cliff Friend) - 2:12

Personnel
Barney Kessel - guitar
Ray Brown - bass
Shelly Manne - drums

References

Contemporary Records albums
Barney Kessel albums
1958 albums